This is a list of mayors of the Far North Queensland city of Cairns.

Cairns was originally established as a Borough with a Chairman from 1885 until 1903, when the Local Authorities Act 1902 transformed it into a Town with a Mayor. The Town achieved City status in 1923. In 1995, when the Shire of Mulgrave amalgamated into the City, the Mayor was elected by a much larger base of voters. In 2008, when the City was amalgamated with the Shire of Douglas into the Cairns Region, the Mayor's voter base expanded yet again.

Borough of Cairns (1885–1903)
The mayors of the Borough of Cairns were:

Town of Cairns (1903–1923)
The mayors of the Town of Cairns were:

City of Cairns Council (1923–1995)
The mayors of the City of Cairns (prior to amalgamation) were:

City of Cairns Council (Amalgamated) (1995–2008)
The mayors of the City of Cairns (following amalgamation):

Cairns Regional Council (2008–present)

References

Cairns
Mayors Cairns